Michael A. Klaper (July 19, 1947) is an American physician, vegan health educator, conference and event speaker, and an author of articles and books of vegan medical advice. Graduating from medical school in 1972, Klaper became a vegan ten years later and subsequently became active in the area, publishing three books advocating veganism and serving as a founding director of the Institute of Nutrition Education and Research.

Early life and education
Klaper was born July 19, 1947 to Chicago South Side dentist, David T. Klaper, DDS, and Jean T. Klaper (formerly of Boca Raton, Florida).  Klaper had an older brother, Robert D. Klaper, who died in 1992 at the age of 49.  By his own report, Klaper grew up on a dairy farm in Wisconsin.  In 1972, Klaper graduated from the University of Illinois College of Medicine and served his medical internship in Canada at Vancouver General Hospital with the University of British Columbia. He also studied obstetrics at the University of California, San Francisco.

His three books were authored during his time with Gentle World in Umatilla, Florida.

In 1987 Klaper appeared on the game show Jeopardy! and won $11,000.

Career
After graduating from medical school Klaper moved among a number of locations, practiced acute care medicine, and eventually became certified in urgent care medicine. He became a vegan in 1981.  He is a medical consultant for the North American Vegetarian Society and has spoken at their Vegetarian Summerfest in 2012 and 2018. Klaper has spoken at several other national and international vegan, vegetarian, and natural health conferences and events.

He served as director of a vegan health spa in Pompano Beach, Florida from the early 1990s and was featured on the 1991 PBS documentary Diet for a New America by John Robbins.  In 1988, Klaper was a NASA nutrition adviser and on vegan diets for long term space colonists.

He also served on the Nutrition and Preventive Medicine Task Force of the American Medical Student Association (AMSA), where he was a member of its Board of Advisors.  He cofounded with John Robbins the environmental organization EarthSave International and served as its Scientific Director.  He was a Founding Director of the Institute of Nutrition Education and Research.

Klaper maintained a medical practice in Maui, Hawaii between 1995 and 2006, and practiced medicine in Whangarei, New Zealand between 2006 and 2009. In 2009, he relocated to Northern California, where as of 2011 he became staff physician and medical consultant at the nutritionally-based TrueNorth Health Center in Santa Rosa, where is now is on the board of directors of the TrueNorth Health Foundation. He is licensed to practice medicine in California and Hawaii and now is affiliated with the Santa Rosa Memorial Hospital.

His books include Vegan Nutrition: Pure and Simple and Pregnancy, Children, and the Vegan Diet.  He has appeared in several films related to vegan diet and practice, including Eat This! (2005), Cowspiracy: The Sustainability Secret (2014), and What the Health (2017).

Klaper is on the advisory board, and regular contributor to the quarterly publication Naked Food Magazine.

In the summer of 1992, he was inducted into the Vegetarian Hall of Fame of the North American Vegetarian Society.

Works
Books

  
Forewords in books, including
 Gentle World. The Cookbook for People Who Love Animals.  Publisher: Gentle World, Inc., 1990.  , 9780929274188.  192 pages.
The author of the 1990 cookbook is Gentle World, and the Foreword was written by Klaper.
Various journal articles, including:
Goldhamer, AC., Klaper, M, Foorohar A, & Myers TR (2015). Water-only fasting and an exclusively plant foods diet in the management of stage IIIa, low-grade follicular lymphoma. BMJ Case Reports, 2015, bcr2015211582. 
Nejad MS, Klaper MA, Steggerda FR, Gianturco C. Radiology. 1968 Aug;91(2):248-50. Clotting on the outer surfaces of vascular catheters. . .
Videos
A Diet for All Reasons
Sense and Nonsense in Nutrition: A Look at Today's Most Common Health Myths. VegSource Studio: 67 minutes. ASIN: B009DOGJOA.

See also
Benjamin Spock
Vegan nutrition

References

External links

 
 Klaper videos
 
 

1947 births
21st-century American physicians
American cookbook writers
American health and wellness writers
American nutritionists
American veganism activists
Fasting advocates
Jewish physicians
Living people
Physicians from Hawaii
Physicians from Chicago
Plant-based diet advocates
University of British Columbia alumni
University of California, San Francisco alumni
University of Illinois Chicago alumni